Martin Dada Abejide Olorunmolu (born August 30, 1948 in Ogiri-Kabba) is a Nigerian clergyman and bishop for the Roman Catholic Diocese of Lokoja. He was appointed bishop in 2005.

See also
Catholic Church in Nigeria

References

External links

1948 births
Living people
Nigerian Roman Catholic bishops
Roman Catholic bishops of Lokoja